Oberlin High School is a Jamaican High School located in West Rural Saint Andrew. The school was started  in January 1946 as Oberlin College (not to be confused with Ohio's Oberlin College).

References

Schools in Jamaica
Buildings and structures in Saint Andrew Parish, Jamaica